Luis Abel Romero (born 29 August 1990) is an Argentine footballer. His last club was Sportivo Rivadavia.

External links
 
 

1986 births
Living people
Argentine footballers
Argentine expatriate footballers
Club Atlético Vélez Sarsfield footballers
Puerto Montt footballers
Unión San Felipe footballers
Primera B de Chile players
Chilean Primera División players
Argentine Primera División players
Expatriate footballers in Chile
Association football defenders
Sportspeople from Mar del Plata